Vera Winifred Buck (15 February 1903 – 2 January 1986) was an Australian composer and pianist.

History 
The daughter of William Buck, an accountant, and Tessa Quinn Herberte, she was born in Kew, Victoria and was educated at private schools in Melbourne. She began playing the piano at a young age. At the age of 15, she wrote her first song Love of You. During the late 1920s, Buck was accompanist for radio station 3AR. In 1930, she received a scholarship to study composition with Fritz Hart. Later that same year, she arranged for her children to be looked after by relatives and moved to Britain. There, she composed songs and performed on stage and on radio. She also coached singers such as Jessie Matthews, Florence Desmond and Robert Naylor.

Her 1932 song The Birds with lyrics by Hilaire Belloc was performed by Florence Austral. She also composed Serenity, published in 1937, with lyrics by her sister Lilian, a poet. Songs published in London included:The Donkey (1935), lyrics by G. K. Chesterton,Blue Bows (1937), lyrics by Helen Taylor, and This Is My Prayer (1938), lyrics by Kenneth Ellis.

Under the pseudonym Pat Francis, she wrote light songs including Across the Sands of Time (1936) and How Wonderful (1937). Her songs Reminiscence (1936), with lyrics by Noel Cripps, and Full Sail (1937), with lyrics by Alfred Perceval Graves, were performed at events associated with the coronation of King George VI.

Buck returned to Melbourne in 1938, continuing to perform. She was resident pianist for radio station 3AW. During World War II, she performed to raise funds and to entertain the troops. Buck served as vice-president of the Guild of Australian Composers. Songs from this period include: A Hymn for Country (1943), lyrics by Toyohiko Kagawa, Take Thou the Burden, Lord (1943), lyrics by Toyohiko Kagawa, and Until the Day I Die (1945), lyrics by A. D. Jones

Personal

In 1922, she married Edgar Charles Wilson Burridge; the couple had two daughters and divorced in 1937. In 1940, she married Bramwell John Gilchrist in the chapel of Wesley Church, Lonsdale Street, Melbourne. His wedding gift to his bride was a grand piano.

She died in Kew at the age of 82.

References 

1903 births
1986 deaths
Australian women composers
Australian women pianists
20th-century Australian pianists
20th-century women pianists
People from Kew, Victoria
Musicians from Melbourne
Australian expatriates in the United Kingdom